This is a list of Poets Laureate of Missouri.

See also

List of U.S. states' Poets Laureate

References

List of Missouri Poets Laureate from the Library of Congress

External links
 Application for poet laureate

 
poets
Missouri
American Poets Laureate